Red Bull KTM Factory Racing is the factory team of KTM active in the MotoGP World Championship supported by sponsor, drinks manufacturer Red Bull.

History

Development of the RC16
KTM have a well established presence amongst off-road motorcycle sport and decided to enter MotoGP in the premier class of motorcycle road racing.

In September 2014, Pit Beirer announced that KTM were to start in MotoGP for 2017, even though work on the project had not started. A year and a half before their MotoGP debut, KTM tested their V4 engine for the first time, a configuration designed to use a steel trellis frame chassis only used by this team.

In October 2015, the KTM RC16 was track-tested on for the first time at the Red Bull Ring with Alex Hofmann as the first test rider on the bike. The team carried out further testing at circuits such as Circuit Ricardo Tormo, Circuito de Jerez, Brno Circuit, Misano World Circuit Marco Simoncelli and Mugello Circuit whilst using test riders, Mika Kallio, Randy De Puniet, Karel Abraham and Thomas Lüthi.

Presentation and Wildcard
The team presented the RC16 to the public for the first time before the start of the 2016 Austrian GP with test riders Kallio and Hofmann doing a couple of laps before announcing that Mika Kallio would have a wildcard entry for the 2016 Valencian GP aboard the RC16, making the official debut race for the machine and KTM into the MotoGP category.

In November 2016, Kallio rode the RC16 as a wildcard at the final race in Valencia, qualifying in 20th place. After initially keeping up with the pace during the opening stages of the race, the bike's rear wheel sensors malfunctioned forcing Kallio to retire from the race.

Final Testing
Pol Espargaró and Bradley Smith tested the RC16 during the first official winter test, just one day after the final grand prix of 2016 season at Valencia. This was the first time that the pair had ridden KTMs after leaving the Tech 3 team where they had been teammates for three years.

KTM had a private test at the Jerez circuit towards the end of November. Due to Espargaró still being under contract with Yamaha at the time, he was unable to test which meant that Mika Kallio stood in for him. In January and February, KTM took part in the official pre-season tests at Sepang International Circuit and Phillip Island Grand Prix Circuit as well as the final test at Losail International Circuit just two weeks before the first Grand Prix of 2017 in March.

The team unveiled the bike at their headquarters at the end of February along with Red Bull KTM Ajo's Moto3 title defender and their new Moto2 KTM competitor.

2017 Debut Season
The team made their debut in the MotoGP category at the 2017 Qatar motorcycle Grand Prix; qualifying in 22nd and 23rd, they were able to finish in 16th and 17th six seconds apart. The team scored their first points in their second grand prix in Argentina, finishing 14th and 15th.

At the 2017 French motorcycle Grand Prix Espargaró finished in 12th place in the race which was the best result until he finished in 11th place in the Dutch TT, and qualified 7th at the 2017 German motorcycle Grand Prix in which Mika Kallio made his second appearance on the RC16 as a wildcard.

Kallio finished 16th whilst Espargaró and Smith collected more points. At the 2017 Czech Republic motorcycle Grand Prix Espargaró  finished in 9th which was the team's first top 10 in a MotoGP Grand Prix. Pol would reach this feat again at the 2017 Australian motorcycle Grand Prix.

2018 season
Expectations from KTM were to step up their results. This had happened at the start of the season with Espargaró finishing in the points a total of seven times in a row. Smith struggled to get the same start to the season that Espargaró had. At the 2018 Spanish motorcycle Grand Prix it was announced that Johann Zarco would replace Smith for 2019.

During the 2018 German motorcycle Grand Prix Kallio suffered a major knee injury during the practice sessions. Injury would then befall Espargaró who broke his collar bone in a warm-up session in preparation for the 2018 Czech Republic motorcycle Grand Prix.

Smith would be the stand-alone KTM factory rider, with Espargaró trying to return from injury too soon resulting in poor results and even not starting a Grand Prix. After a tough season and not meeting as many expectations, the 2018 Valencian Community motorcycle Grand Prix would become the most successful day in KTM so far in Grand Prix Racing. KTM and Espargaró would, respectively, take both their first podiums in the top class of motorcycle grand prix racing with Smith ending his KTM career with a personal best finish with 8th place in the torrential rain of Valencia.

2019 season

In August 2019, contracted rider Johann Zarco announced he would not ride for KTM in 2020. In September 2019, the KTM team announced Zarco would not ride in the remaining six events from 22 September, with test rider Mika Kallio taking his place.

2020 season

On 9 August 2020, KTM secured their first MotoGP win, and their first dry weather podium with Brad Binder at the Czech GP.

2021 season

2022 season

2023

Results

By rider

MotoGP
(key)

References

External links

Motorcycle racing teams
Motorsport in Austria
Red Bull sports teams
Dakar rally racing teams
Motorcycle racing teams established in 2014
2014 establishments in Austria